Vivek–Mervin is an Indian music composer duo consisting of Vivek Siva and Mervin Solomon. They are known for their work in Tamil language films. They worked together on Vadacurry (2014), Dora (2016), Pattas (2020), Sulthan (2021)  Sangathamizhan (2020) and Gulaebaghavali (2018).

Career
Siva trained as a classical musician and performed with numerous bands while in school. Solomon had worked as a music producer, and scored music for albums in gospel and classical genres. Siva, Solomon, and Anirudh Ravichander are from the band Zinx. Vivek and Mervin later worked as music producers and mix engineers for Anirudh.

The songs and background score of their debut movie Vadacurry (2015) were well received. "Nenjukulla Nee" became an instant hit and topped the charts. In their second project Pugazh (2016), the duo roped in Hindi singer Arijit Singh for his first Tamil song "Neeye", which became a chartbuster. They composed music for films with stars such as Dhanush in Pattas, Karthi in Sulthan, Vijay Sethupathy in Sangathamizhan, Nayanthara in Dora, Prabhudeva in Gulaebaghavali, etc. Their own releases became chartbusters and garnered attention from all age groups. Notably songs such as "Orasaadha","Guleba","Chill Bro", "Jai Sulthan", etc., went viral. They released and featured in 3 independent singles in collaboration with Sony Music South. In keeping with their interest in live performance, they did public concerts, award shows, college pro shows, and YouTube One Nation Festival.

Discography
Films

Independent works

References

External links 

 
 

Indian male singer-songwriters
Indian singer-songwriters
Tamil playback singers
Indian musical duos
Loyola College, Chennai alumni
Living people
Musicians from Chennai
Tamil film score composers
Indian male film score composers
Year of birth missing (living people)